Istočni Mojstir is a village in the municipality of Tutin, Serbia. According to the 2002 census, the village has a population of 138 people.

East Mojstir is one of the ethnic Serb villages of Tutin. It is close to the Crna Reka Monastery.

References

Populated places in Raška District